Scarlett Lee (born 20 September 1997) is an English singer. In 2018, she finished as runner-up in the fifteenth series of The X Factor. She also competed in the fourteenth series and reached the six chair challenge, but failed to proceed further.

Career

2017–2018: The X Factor
Lee first auditioned for The X Factor in 2017, where she reached the six-chair challenge in the girls category. She was briefly given a seat by her mentor Sharon Osbourne after her performance of "Without You" by David Guetta and Usher, but was later sent home after a dramatic sing-off between her and eventual finalists Rai-Elle Williams and Alisah Bonaobra, during which she sang "The Power of Love" by Jennifer Rush.

Lee re-auditioned for The X Factor in 2018. She performed her own original song "Survival", but was stopped by Simon Cowell, who was unimpressed with the song. As Cowell urged her to use her performance to convince the audience to root for her, she performed a cover of Loren Allred's "Never Enough" which earned her four yes votes from the judges. She successfully made it past bootcamp and the six-chair challenge to judges' houses in the girls category, mentored by Cowell. She was then chosen by Cowell for the live shows.

In the quarter-final's results, after the elimination of Bella Penfold and Shan Ako, she became the last act in the girls' category. She finished the competition as the runner-up.

2019–present: Upcoming music
Lee began 2019 by performing at Derby Festival and Pride in Aberdeen. In an interview with the Daily Mirror, Lee confirmed that she is working on an album, and has plans to release a plus-size clothing range.

In 2022 Lee signed her first Record Deal with 11/11 Records.

On 26 August 2022, Lee released her debut single "Love Shy".

Also on 25th November 2022, Lee released her first ever Christmas Song Entitled "My Christmas Wish"

Personal life
Lee, a British Romany, was born on 20 September 1997 in Surrey, England. Before The X Factor, Lee worked as a makeup artist. During The X Factor, Lee was involved in a fire, when her brother's caravan set alight. Lee was in the neighbouring caravan at the time, and was later taken into hospital. In January 2019, Lee became engaged to childhood sweetheart Nathan Shaw,  and they married in Christ Church Epsom Common on 30 August 2019.

Discography

Singles

Songwriting credits

References

1997 births
Living people
21st-century English women singers
21st-century English singers
People from Surrey
The X Factor (British TV series) contestants